R (Frack Free Balcombe Residents Association) v West Sussex CC [2014] EWHC 4108 (Admin) is a UK enterprise law case, concerning oil and gas. It held that advice to a council, granting permission to explore an existing hydrocarbon lateral borehole, was not wrong.

Facts
The ‘Frack Free Balcombe Residents Association’ applied for judicial review of West Sussex County Council’s decision to give planning permission to Cuadrilla to explore and appraise an existing hydrocarbon lateral borehole for shale gas (i.e. to see if fracking would work). The Environment Agency, DECC and HSE had given their authorisations. The FFBRA claimed the council’s planning officer wrongly advised its committee that (1) it should leave pollution control, air emissions and ‘well integrity’ to the EA, HSE, etc. (2) Public Health England and HSE had said a well would be sound (3) Cuadrilla’s past breaches of planning conditions, residents objections and costs of protests were all irrelevant when they were.

Judgment
Gilbart J refused the application. The council was in fact entitled to leave regulatory control to the EA and HSE, and in any case there was no evidence that regulatory controls would not be properly applied. There was no evidence that the planning officer had misled the council committee about PHE’s views on sulphur dioxide emissions into the air, produced by the flare.

81-83. Ample controls existed.
100-104. The FFBRA was really attempting to challenge the decision’s merits, not its lawfulness.
109-11. Evidence of past breaches by Cuadrilla were put before the committee, on noise and traffic routing.
116. The committee was well aware of opposition, and there was nothing wrong with the advice of looking at the issues, rather than the number of people raising them.

See also

United Kingdom enterprise law

Notes

References

External links
 Frack Free Balcombe Residents Association

United Kingdom enterprise case law